Makoto Ninomiya and Riko Sawayanagi were the defending champions, but lost in the first round to Miki Miyamura and Varatchaya Wongteanchai.

Ashleigh Barty and Casey Dellacqua won the tournament, defeating Miyamura and Wongteanchai in the final, 6–1, 6–2.

Seeds

Draw

References 
 Draw

Dunlop World Challenge - Women's Doubles
2012 Women's Doubles
2012 Dunlop World Challenge